Martin Harley (born 19 July 1989 in Donegal, Ireland) is a Group 1 winning Irish jockey.

Career
Harley had spells as stable jockey for Mick Channon and Marco Botti, before turning freelance. His first Group 1 victory was for Channon on Samitar in the Irish 1,000 Guineas in May 2012. For Botti, he won the Prix Royal Oak the following year on Tac De Boistron, which helped him to a yearly prize money total of over £1 million for the first time.

His breakthrough triumph was the 2015 King's Stand Stakes at Royal Ascot, on the Robert Cowell-trained Goldream. He won by a short head.
He won the Prix de l'Abbaye with another narrow victory on the same horse later in the season.

In March 2014, in a minor race at Lingfield, he clipped the heels of a rival on Red Art, and was catapulted into the ground, at almost 40 mph. He suffered a broken neck and several broken ribs in an injury that was considered potentially career-ending.

In 2016, he built a successful partnership with stayer Sheikhzayedroad, winning three group races, including the Doncaster Cup and British Champions Long Distance Cup.

Statistics

Flat wins in Great Britain by year

Major wins 
 Great Britain
King's Stand Stakes - Goldream (2015)
 Ireland
Irish 1,000 Guineas - Samitar (2012)
 France
Prix de l'Abbaye - Goldream (2015)
Prix Royal Oak - Tac De Boistron (2013)

Notes

References 

Irish jockeys
Living people
1989 births